Komorowo may refer to:

Komorowo, Lower Silesian Voivodeship (south-west Poland)
Komorowo, Brodnica County in Kuyavian-Pomeranian Voivodeship (north-central Poland)
Komorowo, Lipno County in Kuyavian-Pomeranian Voivodeship (north-central Poland)
Komorowo, Włocławek County in Kuyavian-Pomeranian Voivodeship (north-central Poland)
Komorowo, Ostrów Mazowiecka County in Masovian Voivodeship (east-central Poland)
Komorowo, Sierpc County in Masovian Voivodeship (east-central Poland)
Komorowo, Wyszków County in Masovian Voivodeship (east-central Poland)
Komorowo, Gniezno County in Greater Poland Voivodeship (west-central Poland)
Komorowo, Konin County in Greater Poland Voivodeship (west-central Poland)
Komorowo, Nowy Tomyśl County in Greater Poland Voivodeship (west-central Poland)
Komorowo, Piła County in Greater Poland Voivodeship (west-central Poland)
Komorowo, Szamotuły County in Greater Poland Voivodeship (west-central Poland)
Komorowo, Nidzica County in Warmian-Masurian Voivodeship (north Poland)
Komorowo, Ostróda County in Warmian-Masurian Voivodeship (north Poland)
Komorowo, Pisz County in Warmian-Masurian Voivodeship (north Poland)
Komorowo, Koszalin County in West Pomeranian Voivodeship (north-west Poland)
Komorowo, Łobez County in West Pomeranian Voivodeship (north-west Poland)
Komorowo, Stargard County in West Pomeranian Voivodeship (north-west Poland)

See also
Komorowo Żuławskie near Elbląg in Warmian-Masurian Voivodeship (north Poland)